Stars and Bars is a 1917 American silent film comedy produced by Mack Sennett. It was directed by Victor Heerman.

The film starred Ford Sterling and Harry Gribbon. Also appearing were Nick Cogley, May Emory, Hugh Fay, and Gene Rogers.

References

External links

1917 films
American silent short films
American black-and-white films
1917 comedy films
1917 short films
Silent American comedy films
Films directed by Victor Heerman
American comedy short films
1910s American films